Brasiliothelphusa tapajoensis is a species of freshwater crabs in the family Pseudothelphusidae, and the only species in the genus Brasiliothelphusa. It was described in 1986 from specimens caught in the Rio Tapajós in the state of Pará, Brazil. It is listed as Data Deficient on the IUCN Red List.

References

Pseudothelphusidae
Freshwater crustaceans of South America
Endemic fauna of Brazil
Monotypic decapod genera
Taxobox binomials not recognized by IUCN